Araukome was a town of ancient Phrygia, inhabited in Byzantine times.

Its site is tentatively located near Eymir in Asiatic Turkey.

References

Populated places in Phrygia
Former populated places in Turkey
Populated places of the Byzantine Empire
History of Kütahya Province